This is a list of burn centres in Canada. A burn centre or burn care facility is typically a hospital ward which specializes in the treatment of severe burn injuries. There are currently 24 burns units across Canada. Most provinces have at least one burn unit, and sometimes a centre for adults and another for children.

Alberta
 Calgary Firefighters Burn Treatment Centre, Foothills Hospital
 Firefighters Burn Treatment Unit, University of Alberta Hospital
 Alberta Children's Hospital

British Columbia
 British Columbia Professional Firefighters Burn & Plastic Surgery Unit, Vancouver General Hospital
 British Columbia Children's Hospital, Vancouver
 Royal Jubilee Hospital, Victoria

Manitoba
 [ The Manitoba Firefighters Burn Unit ] [Health Sciences Centre, Winnipeg]]
 [The Firefighters Burn Fund Children's Burn Unit] [The Children's Hospital, Winnipeg]]

New Brunswick
 Saint  John Regional Burn & Plastic Surgery Unit, Saint John Regional Hospital
 General Surgery, Burns, and Plastic, Moncton Hospital

Newfoundland
 The General Hospital, Health Sciences Centre, Janeway Children's Health and Rehabilitation Centre, St. Johns

Nova Scotia
 IWK Health Centre, Halifax
 Queen Elizabeth II Health Sciences Centre, Halifax

Ontario

 Ontario Hyperbaric Oxygen Therapy Centre (Ontario HBOT), Toronto
 Ross Tilley Burn Centre, Sunnybrook & Women’s Health Sciences Centre, Toronto
 Hamilton Firefighters Burn Unit, Hamilton Health Sciences
 The Hospital for Sick Children, Toronto
 4 & 7 North, Essex County Regional Burn Unit, Windsor Regional Hospital
 Children's Hospital of Eastern Ontario, Ottawa

Prince Edward Island
There are no designated burn centres in Prince Edward Island, though PEI hospitals treated 19 child burn cases between April 2015 and January 2016. There was no breakdown of how many burn-treated children at IWK Hospital in Nova Scotia were from PEI.

Quebec
 Centre D'Expertise Aux Soins De Victimes De Brûlures Graves De L’ouest-Du-Québec, Hôtel-Dieu de Montréal
 Montreal Children's Hospital
 Centre D'Expertise Pour Les Personnes Victimes De Brûlures Graves De L’est-Du-Québec Centre Hospitalier Affilié Universitaire De Québec, Hôpital de l'Enfant-Jésus, Quebec City
 Unité Des Soins Intensifs Pédiatriques Chu, Centre hospitalier universitaire Sainte-Justine

Saskatchewan
 Royal University Hospital
 Firefighters Burn Unit, Regina General Hospital

Territories
There are no known burn centres in the territories of Yukon, Nunavut, and the Northwest Territories

References

Medical and health organizations based in Canada
.Burn centers
Burns